Purling is a hamlet in Greene County, New York, United States. Purling had a post office from September 7, 1894, until December 24, 2005; it still has its own ZIP code, 12470.

References

Hamlets in Greene County, New York
Hamlets in New York (state)